Hong Kong Senior Challenge Shield 2008–09, officially named as Eisiti Senior Shield due to the competition's sponsorship by Xiangxue Pharmaceutical, was the 107th season of one of the Asian oldest football knockout competition, Hong Kong Senior Challenge Shield. It was a knockout competition for all the teams of Hong Kong First Division League. The winner would qualify for AFC Cup 2010, if it was a full member of The Hong Kong Football Association.

The final match was held in Hong Kong Stadium on 21 December 2008. The tournament was won by TSW Pegasus, who beat Convoy Sun Hei 3–0 in the final, thanks to two goals from Guy Junior Ondoua and one from Beto. Since TSW Pegasus was not a full member of the Hong Kong Football Association, the AFC Cup 2010 qualification of it was not confirmed before the final of 2008–09 Hong Kong FA Cup.

Calendar

Bracket
{{Round8
|29 November - Mong Kok Stadium|Eastern|0|TSW Pegasus|1
|30 November - Mong Kok Stadium|South China|3|Citizen|1
|29 November - Mong Kok Stadium|Kitchee|2|Convoy Sun Hei (a.e.t.)|3
|30 November - Mong Kok Stadium|Fourway|2|Sheffield United|0
|7 December - Mong Kok Stadium|TSW Pegasus|2 |South China |0
|7 December - Mong Kok Stadium|Convoy Sun Hei (a.e.t.)|1|Fourway |0
|21 December - Hong Kong Stadium|TSW Pegasus |3'|Convoy Sun Hei|0
}}All times are local (UTC+8)''.

First round

Quarter-finals

Semi-finals

Final

Scorers
The scorers in the 2008–09 Hong Kong Senior Challenge Shield are as follows:

6 goals
 Guy Junior Ondoua (TSW Pegasus)

2 goals
 Edson Minga (Fourway)
 Giovane (Convoy Sun Hei)
 Wilfred Bamnjo (Convoy Sun Hei)

1 goal
 Xu Deshuai (Citizen)
 Sandro (Citizen)
 Festus Baise (Citizen)
 Paulinho (Citizen)
 Chen Zhizhao (Citizen)
 Paul Ngue (Kitchee)
 Cheng Lai Hin (Kitchee)
 Tales Schutz (South China)
 Chan Siu Ki (South China)

 Maxwell (South China)
 Lam Hok Hei (Fourway)
 Caleb Ekwenugo (Fourway)
 Chan Yiu Lun (Convoy Sun Hei)
 Chu Siu Kei (Convoy Sun Hei)
 Roberto (Convoy Sun Hei)
 Li Jianbin (Sheffield United)
 Hao Shuang (Sheffield United)
 Joel (NT Realty Wofoo Tai Po)
 Cheng Siu Wai (TSW Pegasus)
 Itaparica (TSW Pegasus)
 Beto (TSW Pegasus)

Own goals
 Ayo Hassan Raimi (Tuen Mun Progoal)
 Steve (Mutual)

Prizes

References

External links
Senior Shield - Hong Kong Football Association

Shield
Hong Kong Senior Shield
Hong Kong Senior Challenge Shield, 2008-09